Vice-Admiral Sir Frank Larken KCB CMG (15 November 1875 – 21 January 1953) was a Royal Navy officer who became Naval Secretary.

Early life and education
Larken was born in Lincoln, Lincolnshire, the middle son of Eliza Larken and solicitor Francis Roper Larken. He was the grandson of Edmund Larken and brother of Hubert Larken, Archdeacon of Lincoln.

In 1889, he entered HMS Britannia as a naval cadet. His desire to go to sea was encouraged by early experience boating with his brothers on Foss Dyke, he told a crowd in 1935: "I do not know that I showed any more aptitude for the sea then than they did, but one day, in a fishing boat at Filey, anchored off the Brig in a nasty swell with a cross tide, they were both very sick a good half-hour before I was. Encouraged by that, the prospect of brass buttons and the fact that midshipman received a salary, which afterwards turned out to mainly illusory, I welcomed the suggestion of my parents that 1 should follow a sea life."

Naval career
Larken served in World War I and, as Captain of the cruiser HMS Doris, he led a successful raid cutting the railway line between Adana and Alexandretta in December 1914 thereby impeding the progress of the Turkish invasion of North Africa.

Engineer Graeme Haldane recalled Larken's tremendous leadership aboard the Doris:

He also saw action at Gallipoli in 1915.

After the War, he was made Captain of the Fleet, Mediterranean Fleet before being given command of the battleship . Following his promotion to rear admiral, he became Naval Secretary in 1925 and Commander of the 2nd Cruiser Squadron in 1927, and, following his promotion to vice admiral in 1929, he went on to command the Reserve Fleet in 1930 before retiring in 1932.

He was made CB in the 1925 New Year Honours and advanced to KCB in the 1932 Birthday Honours.

Personal life
In 1909, he married Victoria Alexandrina Rawson, the daughter of Commander Wyatt Rawson. They had two sons and two daughters. Their son Francis became a Royal Navy captain and Deputy Director of Naval Ordnance at the Admiralty. Their son Nigel was killed in action in 1941 aboard HMS Dolphin.

References

|-

1875 births
1953 deaths
Graduates of Britannia Royal Naval College
Royal Navy vice admirals
Knights Commander of the Order of the Bath
Companions of the Order of St Michael and St George
Royal Navy officers of World War I
People from Lincoln, England
Military personnel from Lincolnshire